Bruce Swedien (April 19, 1934 – November 16, 2020) was an American recording engineer, mixing engineer and record producer. He was widely known for his work with Michael Jackson, Quincy Jones, Paul McCartney and Barbra Streisand.

Swedien first achieved widespread recognition as engineer with Frankie Valli and the Four Seasons' 1962 single "Big Girls Don't Cry" which sold over one million copies and stayed at number one on the Billboard Hot 100 for five weeks.

Swedien won 5 Grammy Awards for Best Engineered Album for his work with Michael Jackson and Quincy Jones. He received 13 additional nominations.

Early life and education
Swedien was born on April 19, 1934, in Minneapolis, Minnesota. His parents, Ellsworth and Louise (Perusse) Swedien, both of Swedish descent, were both classically-trained musicians, leading Swedien to develop a passion for music and recording at an early age. His father bought him a disc recording machine when he was 10 and a professional tape recorder after graduating high school.

Swedien studied electrical engineering with a minor in music at the University of Minnesota but did not graduate. 

At age 20, in 1954 he set up his own recording studio in the old Garrick/LaSalle movie theater in Minneapolis. He transformed the space into the Swedien Recording Studio, where he produced and recorded music for several years with artists such as Art Blakey and Herbie Mann. However, in late 1957, he sold the studio and relocated to Chicago.

Career
In 1957, he left Minneapolis and began working for RCA Victor Records in Chicago. Shortly after that, he left for Universal Recording Corporation where he worked under chief engineer Bill Putnam. He first met Quincy Jones when Jones was vice president for Mercury Records in Chicago. The two worked on albums for artists like Dinah Washington and Sarah Vaughan. Swedien then moved to Brunswick Records where he ran and developed the label's studios and sound in the late 1960s and 1970s. The label was responsible for numerous R&B and pop hits during that time, with artists such as The Chi-Lites, Tyrone Davis and Jackie Wilson.

Swedien was known for pioneering the "Acusonic Recording Process", pairing up microphones together on vocals and instruments, a technique enabled by synchronizing several multi-track recorders with SMPTE timecode. This achieved an enhanced roomy ambient sound, some of which is evident on albums produced in collaboration with Jones on such tracks as George Benson's "Give Me the Night", and the Michael Jackson albums on which he had worked. He would often experiment while recording with Jackson, having the singer stand at different distances from the microphone and singing through a cardboard tube, among other techniques. Swedien wrote about his experience working with Jackson in a 2009 book titled In the Studio With Michael Jackson.

His pop work included recordings by Patti Austin, Natalie Cole, Roberta Flack, Mick Jagger, David Hasselhoff, Jennifer Lopez, Paul McCartney, Diana Ross, Rufus, Chaka Khan, Barbra Streisand, Lena Horne, Donna Summer, and Sarah Vaughan. He worked on the scores for Night Shift, The Color Purple and Running Scared.

Recognition
On November 10, 2001, he was awarded an honorary doctorate in philosophy from the Luleå University of Technology for his achievements as a sound engineer. Swedien also held "masterclasses" at the Swedish National Radio for practicing sound engineers.

On August 30, 2015, he was presented the Pensado Giant Award at the second annual Pensado Awards held at Sony Pictures Studios in Culver City, California. The award was presented by Quincy Jones.

Death
Swedien died at the age of 86 on November 16, 2020, from surgery complications for a broken hip caused by a fall.

Awards 
Swedien won 5 Grammy Awards and was nominated 12 times.

References

External links
In The Studio with Bruce Swedien
 
Archived interview with Mr. Bonzai, November 2006
Bruce Swedien on Recording, Mixing Michael Jackson
An Incredible New Sound for Engineers 
Q&A session with Bruce Swedien on GearSlutz
Bruce Swedien Interview - NAMM Oral History Library (2016)

American audio engineers
Grammy Award winners
Record producers from Minnesota
Businesspeople from Minneapolis
2020 deaths
American people of Swedish descent
1934 births